The Engineering Staff College of India (ESCI) (established 1982) is an autonomous organ of The Institution of Engineers (India) and imparts continuing education to engineers and managers in the engineering profession. ESCI anchors consultancy services to government agencies and industry. It is certified for quality under ISO 9001:2008. ESCI is located in Hyderabad, Telangana. ESCI has formal linkages with several eminent engineers, managers, and academicians who serve as adjunct faculty and consultants and has been recognized by the All India Council for Technical Education. Dr L. V. Muralikrishna Reddy is the Chairman of the Board of Management and Brig A. Umar Farook, VSM serves as the director of the ESCI.

References

External links
 Official site of Engineering Staff College of India
 IT Division, Engineering Staff College of India

Engineering colleges in Hyderabad, India
Indian engineering organisations
Professional associations based in India
1982 establishments in Andhra Pradesh